む, in hiragana, or ム in katakana, is one of the Japanese kana, which each represent one mora. The hiragana is written with three strokes, while the katakana is written with two. Both represent .

In older Japanese texts until the spelling reforms of 1900, む was also used to transcribe the nasalised . Since the reforms, it is replaced in such positions with ん. 

In the Ainu language, ム can be written as small ㇺ, which represents a final m sound.  This, along with other extended katakana, was developed by Japanese linguists to represent Ainu sounds that do not exist in standard Japanese katakana.

Stroke order

Other communicative representations 

 Full Braille representation

 Character encodings

See also 
厶 (Radical 28)

References 

Specific kana